The 2019 Cork Premier Intermediate Hurling Championship was the 16th staging of the Cork Premier Intermediate Hurling Championship since its establishment by the Cork County Board in 2004. The draw for the opening round fixtures took place on 15 January 2019. The championship began on 19 April 2019 and ended on 12 October 2019.

On 12 October 2019, Fr. O'Neill's won the championship after a 3-23 to 1-20 defeat of Kilworth in the final at Páirc Uí Rinn. It was their first ever championship title in this grade.

Declan Dalton from the Fr. O'Neill's club was the championship's top scorer with 3-45.

Team changes

To Championship

Promoted from the Cork Intermediate Hurling Championship
 Ballincollig

From Championship

Promoted to the Cork Senior Hurling Championship
 Charleville

Fixtures/results

Round 1

Round 2

Round 3

Quarter-finals

Semi-finals

Final

Championship statistics

Scoring events

Widest winning margin: 14 points
Carrigaline 3-21 - 2-10 Aghada (Round 3)
Most goals in a match: 7
Fr. O'Neill's 5-14 - 2-12 Fermoy (Round 3)
Most points in a match: 45
Fermoy 1-23 - 1-22 Courcey Rovers (Round 1)
Most goals by one team in a match: 5
Fr. O'Neill's 5-14 - 2-12 Fermoy (Round 3)
Most goals scored by a losing team: 3
Valley Rovers 3-14 - 3-22 Blarney (Quarter-final)
Most points scored by a losing team: 22 
Courcey Rovers 1-22 - 1-23 Fermoy (Round 3)

Top scorers

Top scorer overall

Top scorers in a single game

References

External links

 Cork GAA website

Cork Premier Intermediate Hurling Championship
Cork Premier Intermediate Hurling Championship